Jesús Emanuel Pretell Panta (born 26 March 1999) is a Peruvian professional footballer who plays as a midfielder for Sporting Cristal.

International career
He made his Peruvian national team debut on 9 June 2019 in a friendly against Colombia, as a 67th-minute substitute for Renato Tapia.

Career statistics

Club

Notes

International

References

External links

1999 births
Living people
Peruvian footballers
Peru under-20 international footballers
Peru international footballers
Association football midfielders
Atlético Grau footballers
Sporting Cristal footballers
Club Deportivo Universidad de San Martín de Porres players
FBC Melgar footballers
Peruvian Primera División players
Footballers from Lima
2019 Copa América players